Pirkani (also Romanized as Pīrkānī) is an urban tribe in Quetta, Quetta District, Pakistan. At the 2018 census, its population was 35,000.

References 

Tribes of Pakistan
People from Quetta